Too Much Speed is a 1921 American silent drama film directed by Frank Urson, written by Byron Morgan, and starring Wallace Reid, Agnes Ayres, Theodore Roberts, Jack Richardson, Lucien Littlefield, and Guy Oliver. It was released on June 5, 1921, by Paramount Pictures. It is not known whether the film currently survives.

Premise
Egotistical race-car driver Dusty Rhoades (Reid) learns that humility pays off even better than acclaim.

Cast 
Wallace Reid as 'Dusty' Rhoades
Agnes Ayres as Virginia MacMurran
Theodore Roberts as Pat MacMurran
Jack Richardson as Tyler Hellis
Lucien Littlefield as Jimmy Rodman
Guy Oliver	as 'Howdy' Zeeker
Henry Johnson as Billy Dawson
Jack Herbert as Hawks

See also
Wallace Reid filmography

References

External links 

 
 

1921 films
1920s English-language films
American auto racing films
Silent American drama films
1921 drama films
Paramount Pictures films
American black-and-white films
American silent feature films
Films directed by Frank Urson
1920s American films